Astorre Baglioni (March 1526 – 4 August 1571) was an Italian condottiero and military commander.

Biography
He was born in Perugia, the son of Gentile Baglioni, a member of a condottieri family of central Italy. At the death of his father, he was first at Tagliacozzo under Ascanio Colonna, and then to Città di Castello where he was introduced  to the military career by his uncle Alessandro Vitelli.

In 1540 he fought under the latter at Pest against the Turks. In 1550 he was on a frigate in a Christian fleet led by Carlo Sforza, to fight against the northern African raider Dragut. In 1556-1558 he was hired by the Republic of Venice, for which he supervised building of fortifications in the Venetian mainland and was governor of Verona.

In 1569 he was named governor of Nicosia in Cyprus.

In 1570, when a war between Venice and the Ottoman Empire was upcoming, he revised the fortifications of Cerines and Famagusta, of which Baglioni became governor, in collaboration with the city's rector Marcantonio Bragadin. In the same year the island was invaded by the Turks. Baglioni launched several counterattacks but was finally forced with his troops in the walls of Famagusta. After the fall of Nicosia, the Turks laid siege to Famagusta, and Baglioni launched a series of successful raids against the besiegers. The Turks lost some 52,000 men in five major assaults until, in late July, the Venetians, despairing to receive any rescue from the homeland, decided to surrender. The Turk commander, Lala Kara Mustafa Pasha, accorded the survivors to safely return to Crete, but he did not keep his word: Bragadin, Baglioni and other Venetian commanders were imprisoned, beaten and beheaded.

See also

 Siege of Famagusta
 Venetian Cyprus
 Marcantonio Bragadin
 Stato da Mar

Notes

Sources

External links
 Astorre Baglioni biography 

1526 births
1571 deaths
16th-century condottieri
People from Perugia
Republic of Venice military personnel
16th-century executions by the Ottoman Empire
Executed Italian people
People executed by the Ottoman Empire by decapitation
Republic of Venice people of the Ottoman–Venetian Wars
Venetian governors
Venetian Cyprus